Sinohyus was a genus of ground dwelling omnivorous even toed ungulates that existed in Asia during the Pliocene.

Originally classified in the genus Sus, its teeth were considered distinct enough for it to be placed in its own genus.

References

Neogene mammals of Asia
Fossil taxa described in 1963
Pliocene even-toed ungulates
Prehistoric even-toed ungulate genera
Pliocene mammals of Asia
Prehistoric Suidae
Hippohyini